The Dead Outside is a 2008 Scottish horror/thriller film, the feature debut of director Kerry Anne Mullaney (who also co-wrote the film), produced independently by Mothcatcher Films.

Synopsis 
Set in a world devastated by a neurological pandemic, the film focuses on two survivors, April Scott and Daniel, who meet on an isolated farm in Scotland. April is immune to the disease and Daniel tries to get her to see someone about it as she might be the answer to a cure for the disease. April refuses to do so. Another woman, Kate, makes her way to the farm and is allowed to stay for the night. Kate is a nurse and when she understands April's potential value as a cure, she drugs her and attempts to kidnap her and take her back to the medical experts for further study. It is revealed that April had already escaped from a medical lab where experiments had been performed on her. Kate's car crashes and Daniel is able to catch up and help April back to the safety of the farm. Kate becomes infected with the disease and is killed by April when she tries to kill Daniel.

Though ostensibly a zombie film, the film concentrates on the psychological states of the lead characters.

Production
The Dead Outside was filmed in Dumfries & Galloway over 15 days in March 2008.

Awards and nominations

Awards 
 Special Jury Mention at the Festival Internazionale della Fantascienza di Trieste 2008 (aka. Science+Fiction)
 Golden Unicorn for Best Film and the Silver Unicorn for Best Director at the 10th Estepona International Horror and Fantasy Film Festival

Nominations 
 BAFTA Scotland New Talent Awards (2009) in the categories of Best New Work, Director, Producer, and Writer

Première

The Dead Outside premièred at the London FrightFest Film Festival on 25 August 2008.

References

External links
 
 

2008 horror films
2008 films
British horror films
British zombie films
Scottish horror films
2000s English-language films
English-language Scottish films
2000s British films